Ueckermann is a surname. Notable people with the surname include:

Ernst Ueckermann (born 1954), South African composer and pianist
Franswa Ueckermann (born 1994), South African rugby union player